Bhanga Junction Railway Station is a junction station of Bangladesh. It is a junction which is being built in Bhanga. It will connect Dhaka with Jessore, Rajbari and Port of Payra through Padma Bridge. Its construction is likely to be end in June 2023.

History
Padma Bridge Rail Link Project brings South and South Western regions of Bangladesh under the railway network. In the first phase, a 172 km broad gauge railway line is being constructed from Dhaka's Kamalapur to Jessore in the southwestern district. The rail link project is scheduled to be completed in 2024. From December 2022, trains have been running on the 51 km railway from the stations of Mawa to Bhanga. Construction of Rajbari–Bhanga line from the existing Bhanga railway station to the area further east made the new station a junction station. Construction of railway from Bhanga Junction railway station to Payra Port is in progress. Bhanga junction is being developed as an iconic station incorporating all modern railway features. The station building is building on 6,516 square metres for budget .

Routes
The station will use three railway lines:
 Rajbari–Bhanga line
 Dhaka–Jessore line
 Bhanga–Kuakata line

References

External link
 

Railway stations in Faridpur District
Railway junction stations in Bangladesh
Railway stations scheduled to open in 2023